Jenny Whiteley is a Canadian country and folk singer-songwriter.  She was a member of the band Heartbreak Hill, and released several solo albums of folk music.  She has won two Juno Awards for her music.

Early life and family
Whiteley grew up in Toronto. She is the daughter of blues musician Chris Whiteley and his wife Caitlin Hanford. Her brother is Dan Whiteley, who is also a folk musician and singer, and her uncle is folk musician Ken Whiteley.

Career
She began her musical career as a child, recording with Canadian children's musician Raffi along with her brother Dan.

In the 1990s she performed with the bluegrass band Heartbreak Hill. Just prior to that band's breakup, she released her self-titled debut album in 2001, and followed up with Hopetown in 2004. Both albums won the Juno Award for Best Roots & Traditional Album of the Year. She has released three more albums since: Dear, Forgive or Forget and The Original Jenny Whiteley, all getting good reviews. Her last four records have been released through Black Hen Music. Steve Dawson produced Hopetown, Dear and Forgive or Forget.

She has also collaborated with Sarah Harmer, Amy Millan, Carolyn Mark and Riley Baugus.

Personal life
Whiteley moved from Toronto to a country home near Elphin, Ontario in eastern Ontario with her musician husband, Joey Wright (b. October 9, 1973), in January 2002. She and Joey have two daughters, Lila (born April 16, 2003) and Audrey (born September 18, 2007).

Discography

With Heartbreak Hill
 Heartbreak Hill (1998)

Solo
 Jenny Whiteley (2001)
 Hopetown (2004)
 Dear (2006)
 Forgive or Forget (2010)
 The Original Jenny Whiteley (2016)

Awards and recognition
Juno Awards
 1999 nominee, Best Roots/Traditional Album: Group: Heartbreak Hill
Canadian Folk Music Awards
 2007 nominee, Best Contemporary Album: Dear

Juno Awards
 2001 Best Roots/Traditional Album: Jenny Whiteley
 2005 Roots/Traditional Album of the Year: Hopetown

References

External links
 Official Jenny Whiteley website

1971 births
Living people
Canadian folk singers
Canadian women country singers
Canadian country singer-songwriters
Canadian women folk singers
Juno Award for Roots & Traditional Album of the Year – Solo winners
Musicians from Toronto
21st-century Canadian women singers
Black Hen Music artists
MapleMusic Recordings artists